José Ángel Sarrapio Borboja (born 21 February 1959) is a Spanish former professional road bicycle racer. In 1986 he won stage 10 of the Tour de France.

Major results
Source:

1985
 1st  Overall Vuelta a los Valles Mineros
1st Stage 3
 1st Stage 13 Vuelta a España
 1st Stage 2 Troféu Joaquim Agostinho
1986
 1st Stage 10 Tour de France
1987
 1st Stage 1 Troféu Joaquim Agostinho
1988
 1st Stage 6 Vuelta a Aragón
1989
 1st GP Cuprosan

Grand Tour general classification results timeline

References

External links 
 

Spanish male cyclists
1959 births
Living people
Spanish Tour de France stage winners
Spanish Vuelta a España stage winners
People from Oriente (Asturian comarca)
Cyclists from Asturias